Qarluq, in Iran, may refer to:
 Qarloq, Markazi
 Qarluq, Zanjan
 Qarluq, Abhar, Zanjan Province

See also
Qarloq (disambiguation)
Karluk (disambiguation)